Kotewall Road is a street in Mid-Levels, Hong Kong Island, Hong Kong, located between Po Shan Road and Robinson Road. It is a 400-metre-long two-way road located on hill slopes south of Sai Ying Pun.

Name
The road was named after Sir Robert Hormus Kotewall, a prominent Chinese-Parsee businessman and legislator during the colonial era, who built the road in the 1910s.

History
Kotewall Road was once known for its concentration of vehicle-repairing garages, mainly servicing the wealthy residents of Mid-Levels. Stone House, a Grade III historic building built in 1923 at 15 Kotewall Road is the only garage of this kind remaining, now turned into a private residence.

Nearby places
 University of Hong Kong
 University Drive

See also
 1972 Hong Kong landslides

References
 

Mid-Levels
Roads on Hong Kong Island